The Pakistani cricket team played one one-day international against Bangladesh on 16 March 1999. The match was styled as the Meril Challenge Cup.

The match was held immediately prior to the Meril International Tournament 1998–99 between Bangladesh, Kenya and Zimbabwe.

The match was arranged when it appeared that the 1998–99 Asian Test Championship final between Pakistan and Sri Lanka would finish in four days. When the Test match finished after lunch on the fourth day, the one-day international was played on what would have been the fifth day.

One Day International (ODI match)

References

1999 in Bangladeshi cricket
1999 in Pakistani cricket
Pakistani cricket tours of Bangladesh
Bangladeshi cricket seasons from 1971–72 to 2000
International cricket competitions from 1997–98 to 2000